Shomari Buchanan (born January 11, 1977) is an American football wide receiver. He played college football for the University of Alabama. and won a SEC Championship his senior year with the Alabama Crimson Tide. He has experience in the NFL, Arena Football League, af2 and also played for the Corpus Christi Hammerheads of the Intense Football League.

References

1977 births
Living people
People from Corpus Christi, Texas
Sports in Corpus Christi, Texas
American football wide receivers
Alabama Crimson Tide football players
Corpus Christi Hammerheads players